Hercules Furens can refer to:

Herakles (Euripides), also called Hercules Furens, a Greek tragedy
Hercules (Seneca) or Hercules Furens, a fabula crepidata